In geometry, the napkin-ring problem involves finding the volume of a "band" of specified height around a sphere, i.e. the part that remains after a hole in the shape of a circular cylinder is drilled through the center of the sphere. It is a counterintuitive fact that this volume does not depend on the original sphere's radius but only on the resulting band's height.

The problem is so called because after removing a cylinder from the sphere, the remaining band resembles the shape of a napkin ring.

Statement 
Suppose that the axis of a right circular cylinder passes through the center of a sphere of radius  and that  represents the height (defined as the distance in a direction parallel to the axis) of the part of the cylinder that is inside the sphere. The "band" is the part of the sphere that is outside the cylinder. The volume of the band depends on  but not on :

As the radius  of the sphere shrinks, the diameter of the cylinder must also shrink in order that  can remain the same.  The band gets thicker, and this would increase its volume.  But it also gets shorter in circumference, and this would decrease its volume.  The two effects exactly cancel each other out.  In the extreme case of the smallest possible sphere, the cylinder vanishes (its radius becomes zero) and the height  equals the diameter of the sphere.  In this case the volume of the band is the volume of the whole sphere, which matches the formula given above.

An early study of this problem was written by 17th-century Japanese mathematician Seki Kōwa.

Proof 

By the Pythagorean theorem, the radius of the cylinder is

The cross-section of the band with the plane at height  is the region inside the larger circle of radius given by (2) and outside the smaller circle of radius given by (1). The cross-section's area is therefore the area of the larger circle minus the area of the smaller circle:

The radius R does not appear in the last quantity. The volume of the band is

 

This is an application of Cavalieri's principle: volumes with equal-sized corresponding cross-sections are equal.  Indeed, the area of the cross-section is the same as that of the corresponding cross-section of a sphere of radius , which has volume

See also 
 Visual calculus, an intuitive way to solve this type of problem, originally applied to finding the area of an annulus, given only its chord length
 String girdling Earth, another problem where the radius of a sphere or circle is counter-intuitively irrelevant

References 

 Problem 132 asks for the volume of a sphere with a cylindrical hole drilled through it, but does not note the invariance of the problem under changes of radius.
. Levi argues that the volume depends only on the height of the hole based on the fact that the ring can be swept out by a half-disk with the height as its diameter.
. Reprint of 1935 edition. A problem on page 101 describes the shape formed by a sphere with a cylinder removed as a "napkin ring" and asks for a proof that the volume is the same as that of a sphere with diameter equal to the length of the hole.
. Reprint of 1954 edition.
. Republished by Dover, 2004, . Smith and Mikami discuss the napkin ring problem in the context of two manuscripts of Seki on the mensuration of solids, Kyuseki and Kyuketsu Hengyo So.

External links 

 

Volume
Japanese mathematics
Recreational mathematics
Articles containing proofs
Mathematical problems